Johann Gottfried Pratsch (also called Prach, c. 1750 - c. 1818), was a Czech composer of music. He spent most of his life in Russia, and sometimes supported himself by teaching music to students at the Smolnїy Institute and at the St. Petersburg Theatre School.

Pratsch was born in Silesia in 1750, and was Czech by nationality. He worked as a piano teacher in Saint Petersburg in the 1770s. He taught music at the Smolnїy Institute from 1780 to 1785. In 1784, the St. Petersburg Theatre School appointed him harpsichord teacher.
He collaborated with Nikolay Lvov on a collection of Russian folk songs, which was published in 1790. The collection, called "Sobraniye Narodnїkh Russikikh Pesen s Ikh Golosami" ("Collection of Russian Folk Songs with Their Tunes"), influenced composers in Russia and throughout the world, including composers such as Alexander Glazunov, Alexander Gretchaninov, Sergei Rachmaninoff, Igor Stravinsky, Gioachino Rossini, Johann Nepomuk Hummel, Carl Maria von Weber, Fernando Sor, and Ludwig van Beethoven.

He collaborated with Nikolay Lvov on a collection of Russian folk songs, which was published in 1790. The collection, called "Sobraniye Narodnїkh Russikikh Pesen s Ikh Golosami" ("Collection of Russian Folk Songs with Their Tunes"), influenced composers in Russia and throughout the world, including composers such as Alexander Glazunov, Alexander Gretchaninov, Sergei Rachmaninoff, Igor Stravinsky, Gioachino Rossini, Johann Nepomuk Hummel, Carl Maria von Weber, Fernando Sor, and Ludwig van Beethoven.

Works
Rondo in F major
Sonata for piano in C major, Opus no. 1
Fandango for piano, Opus no. 2 (1795)
Cello sonata in A minor, Opus 6

Publications 

 1790: A Collection of Russian Folk Songs (Nikolai Lvov and Ivan Prach)

See also 

 Russian folk music 
 Nikolay Lvov
 Russian Museum of Ethnography
 List of Russian composers

Notes

Czech classical composers
Czech male classical composers
1750 births
1818 deaths
18th-century Bohemian musicians
Russian folk music
Male classical composers